Donald William "Dippy" Simmons (September 13, 1931 – September 24, 2010) was a Canadian ice hockey goaltender. He played for the Boston Bruins, Toronto Maple Leafs, and New York Rangers of the National Hockey League between 1956 and 1969. He won the Stanley Cup three times in a row with the Maple Leafs, from 1962 to 1964.

Playing career
Simmons was called up by the Boston Bruins from the Springfield Indians of the minor American Hockey League in order to replace an ailing Terry Sawchuk who had left the Bruins in mid-season of 1957. He then spent 3 seasons partnering with veteran Harry Lumley as an effective netminding duo in Boston. Simmons was the second goaltender to adopt the face mask, after Jacques Plante introduced it in 1959. Later, Simmons would back up Johnny Bower in Toronto in the early 1960s and was instrumental in the Leafs winning the Stanley Cup in 1962. He finished his career playing with the New York Rangers. Don Simmons was the founder of Don Simmons Sports, a successful Ontario franchise specializing in goalie equipment.

Career statistics

Regular season and playoffs

Awards and achievements
1962 Stanley Cup Championship (Toronto)
1963 Stanley Cup  Championship (Toronto)
1964 Stanley Cup Championship (Toronto)
1963 NHL All Star (Toronto)

External links
 
Picture of Don Simmons' name on the 1962 Stanley Cup Plaque
Picture of Don Simmons' name on the 1963 Stanley Cup Plaque

1931 births
2010 deaths
Baltimore Clippers players
Boston Bruins players
Buffalo Bisons (AHL) players
Canadian expatriate ice hockey players in the United States
Canadian ice hockey goaltenders
Canadian people of British descent
Galt Rockets players
Ice hockey people from Ontario
Johnstown Jets (IHL) players
New York Rangers players
Ontario Hockey Association Senior A League (1890–1979) players
People from Port Colborne
Providence Reds players
Rochester Americans players
St. Catharines Teepees players
Springfield Indians players
Stanley Cup champions
Toronto Maple Leafs players
Tulsa Oilers (1964–1984) players
Vancouver Canucks (WHL) players